My Happiness is a studio album by French singer Amanda Lear, released on March 17, 2014 by the independent label Boomlover. The album is a tribute to Elvis Presley.

Background 
Amanda Lear began her musical career with a cover version of Elvis Presley's "Trouble" in 1975, and has since also recorded "Fever" (1982) and "Always on My Mind" (2009), both songs closely associated with his repertoire. My Happiness features thirteen songs previously performed by Presley, and is Lear's third album consisting exclusively of cover versions, after A L and With Love.

Lear announced working on a new album in May 2013, via her official Facebook page, with originally planned release date in autumn 2013. The recording sessions would eventually continue into November at Studio Entouka in Paris, and the album received its release in March 2014.

"Suspicious Minds" was released as the first single in an edited version. The music video, directed by Thibault Guerin, was released on 13 March, followed by "What Now My Love" in June. The album charted in French Physical and Digital Albums Chart, but failed to enter the general sales chart.

The deluxe version of the album was released in November 2014, and included dance remixes of selected songs as well as the previously unreleased cover of "Love Me Tender".

Track listing

Original edition 
 "Burning Love" (Dennis Linde) – 3:28
 "Suspicious Minds" (Mark James) – 5:03
 "All Shook Up" (Otis Blackwell, Elvis Presley) – 2:14
 "Are You Lonesome Tonight" (Lou Handman, Roy Turk) – 3:07
 "It's Now or Never" (Aaron Schroeder, Alfredo Mazzucchi, Wally Gold) – 3:22
 "(You're the) Devil in Disguise" (Bill Giant, Bernie Baum, Florence Kaye) – 2:39
 "Viva Las Vegas" (Doc Pomus, Mort Shuman) – 2:24
 "Heartbreak Hotel" (Elvis Presley, Mae Boren Axton, Tommy Durden) – 3:50
 "What Now My Love" (Carl Sigman, Gilbert Bécaud, Pierre Delanoë) – 3:11
 "Trouble" (Jerry Leiber and Mike Stoller) – 2:44
 "You Don't Have to Say You Love Me" (Pino Donaggio, Simon Napier-Bell, Vicki Wickham, Vito Pallavicini) – 3:08
 "Can't Help Falling in Love" (George David Weiss, Hugo Peretti, Luigi Creatore) – 3:26
 "My Happiness" (Robert Maxwell) – 2:47

Deluxe edition 
 "Suspicious Minds" (Almighty Radio Edit) (Mark James) – 4:03
 "Suspicious Minds" (Dance Mix) (Mark James) – 4:49
 "(You're the) Devil in Disguise" (Dance Mix) (Chris Hillman, Gram Parsons) – 2:53
 "Burning Love" (Dance Mix) (Dennis Linde) – 3:56
 "Viva Las Vegas" (Dance Mix) (Doc Pomus, Mort Shuman) – 2:48
 "Burning Love" (Dennis Linde) – 3:29
 "Suspicious Minds" (Mark James) – 5:04
 "All Shook Up" (Otis Blackwell, Elvis Presley) – 2:14
 "Are You Lonesome Tonight" (Lou Handman, Roy Turk) – 3:08
 "It's Now or Never" (Aaron Schroeder, Alfredo Mazzucchi, Wally Gold) – 3:22
 "(You're the) Devil in Disguise" (Chris Hillman, Gram Parsons) – 2:40
 "Viva Las Vegas" (Doc Pomus, Mort Shuman) – 2:26
 "Heartbreak Hotel" (Elvis Presley, Mae Boren Axton, Tommy Durden) – 3:51
 "What Now My Love" (Carl Sigman, Gilbert Bécaud, Pierre Delanoë) – 3:12
 "Trouble" (Jerry Leiber and Mike Stoller) – 2:46
 "Love Me Tender" (Elvis Presley, George R. Poulton, Ken Darby) – 4:08
 "You Don't Have to Say You Love Me" (Pino Donaggio, Simon Napier-Bell, Vicki Wickham, Vito Pallavicini) – 3:10
 "Can't Help Falling in Love" (George David Weiss, Hugo Peretti, Luigi Creatore) – 3:28
 "My Happiness" (Robert Maxwell) – 2:47
 "Suspicious Minds" (Almighty Club Edit) (Mark James) – 5:45
 "Suspicious Minds"/"Viva Las Vegas"/"Burning Love"/"(You're the) Devil in Disguise" (Bruce Discomix) (Mark James, Doc Pomus, Mort Shuman, Dennis Linde, Chris Hillman, Gram Parsons) – 14:01

Personnel 
 Amanda Lear – lead vocals
 Gaël Brusseleers – sound engineer
 Mauro Delgado-Diaz – trumpet
 Romain Durand – trombone
 Jean Paul Gaultier – clothes
 Thibault Guerin – artwork, photography
 Melina Jacob – backing vocals
 Pierre-Marie Jubin – backing vocals
 Bob Landser – musical arranger, guitar, percussion, piano, backing vocals
 Alix Malka – photography
 Alain Mendiburu – record producer
 Elena Mineva – violin
 Manon Philippe – violin
 Eva Sinclair – violin
 Clément Mao Takacs – orchestra leader
 Dima Tsypkin – violoncello
 Julien Vern – flute

Chart performance

Release history

References

External links 
 My Happiness at Discogs
 My Happiness at Rate Your Music

2014 albums
Amanda Lear albums
Covers albums
Elvis Presley tribute albums